The Hero of Socialist Labour was an honorific title in the Soviet Union and other Warsaw Pact countries from 1938 to 1991. It represented the highest degree of distinction in the USSR and was awarded for exceptional achievements in Soviet industry and culture. It provided a similar status to the title of Hero of the Soviet Union, which was awarded for heroic deeds, but differed in that it was not awarded to foreign citizens.

History

The Title "Hero of Socialist Labour" was introduced by decree of the Presidium of the Supreme Soviet of the Soviet Union on December 27, 1938.

Originally, Heroes of Socialist Labour were awarded the highest decoration of the Soviet Union, the Order of Lenin, and a diploma from the Presidium of the Supreme Soviet of the Soviet Union. In order to distinguish the Heroes of Socialist Labour from other Order of Lenin recipients, the "Hammer and Sickle" gold medal was introduced by decree of the Presidium on 22 May 1940, to accompany the Order of Lenin and diploma.

The first recipient of the award was Joseph Stalin, awarded by the Presidium of the Supreme Soviet on December 20, 1939. The second recipient was machine gun designer Vasily Degtyaryov (2 January 1940). Post-1945 recipients include Mikhail Koshkin, Mikhail Kalashnikov, Nikolai Afanasyev, Emilian Bucov, Alexander Tselikov, Dmitri Shostakovich, German Korobov, Peter Andreevich Tkachev, and Andrei Tupolev.

By September 1, 1971, 16,245 people (11,748 men, 4,497 women) had been awarded the title of Hero of Socialist Labour. One hundred and five people (80 men, 25 women) have been awarded multiple "Hammer and Sickle" medals. By 1991, at the dissolution of the Soviet Union, over 20,000 people had been awarded the title.

In the history of the USSR, 16 people became Heroes of Socialist Labour three times:
 Anatoly Alexandrov
 Boris Vannikov
 Nikolai Dukhov
 Yakov Zeldovich
 Sergey Ilyushin
 Mstislav Keldysh
 Dinmukhamed Kunaev
 Igor Kurchatov
 Andrei Sakharov
 
 Andrei Tupolev
 Hamroqul Tursunqulov
 Yulii Khariton
 Nikita Khrushchev
 Konstantin Chernenko
 Kirill Shchelkin

In March 2013, Vladimir Putin issued a decree establishing a title considered to be its successor, "Hero of Labour of the Russian Federation".

Statute
The Honorific title "Hero of Socialist Labour" was awarded by the Presidium to citizens who made significant contributions to the advancement of Soviet industry, agriculture, transportation, trade, science and technology, or otherwise served as exemplary models of the Soviet worker.

Heroes of Socialist Labour who attained further exceptional achievements were awarded a second "Hammer and Sickle" medal and bronze busts of the Heroes were to be constructed in their hometowns to mark the occasion. Thrice Heroes of Socialist Labour were to have their busts placed near the planned Palace of the Soviets, but this was never implemented as the Palace of Soviets was never built.

Only the Presidium of the Supreme Soviet of the Soviet Union could deprive a person of this title. The insignia "Hero of Socialist Labour", like the "Hero of the Soviet Union" Gold Star Medal, is always worn in full on the left side of the chest and in the presence of other orders and medals, placed above them. If worn with honorific titles of the Russian Federation, the latter have precedence.

Award description
The title "Hero of Socialist Labour" was designed by the artist A. Pomansky. Its Gold Hammer and Sickle insignia was a five-pointed star with smooth dihedral rays on the obverse, the diameter of the circumscribed star was 33.5 mm. In the centre of the obverse, a relief hammer and sickle respectively of 14 and 13 mm. It weighed 15.25 grams.

The reverse was plain and was surrounded by a slightly raised rim. In the centre, the relief inscription "Hero of Socialist Labour" in 2mm high letters, the award serial number was inscribed just above in 1mm high numbers.

The insignia was secured to a standard 25 × 15 mm Soviet square mount by a ring through the suspension loop. The mount was covered by a red silk moiré ribbon. On the reverse of the mount was a threaded stub and nut to secure the award to clothing.

See also 

 List of people awarded the Hero of Socialist Labour
 Hero of Labour (GDR)
 Hero of Labor (North Korea)
 Hero of Labor (Vietnam)
 Order of the Hero of Socialist Labour (Yugoslavia)

References

 Oruzhie Magazine, Page 9, Issue 5 1998 & Issue 6 1998.
 "Солдат удачи" номер 9 (72) 2000 Д.Ширяев "Кто изобрел автомат Калашникова"

External links
 History of the award 
  Legal Library of the USSR

Civil awards and decorations of the Soviet Union
Awards established in 1938
Awards disestablished in 1991
Honorary titles of the Soviet Union
1938 establishments in the Soviet Union
1991 disestablishments in the Soviet Union
Business and industry awards
Hero (title)
Heroes of Socialist Labour